The giant Laotian harvestman is the unofficial name for an as-yet undescribed species of opiliones belonging to the family Sclerosomatidae. The species was discovered in April 2012 near a cave in the southern province of Khammouan, by Dr. Peter Jäger of the Senckenberg Research Institute in Frankfurt, Germany, whilst shooting a television documentary about the wildlife of Laos.

Physical description 

The giant Laotian harvestman dwells inside the caves of Laos, and has a leg span stretching just over 330 millimeters (13 inches), thus making it the second largest harvestman discovered so far – surpassed only by another species in South America. It is currently unknown why it has such a large leg span, but it is believed that, since opiliones breathe through their legs, a larger leg span makes respiration easier in the caves' low oxygen environment.

Predators

Predators of the giant Laotian harvestman most likely include the larger but not as lengthy giant huntsman spider (Heteropoda maxima), Thereuopoda longicornis, other larger arthropods in terms of body mass – such as other predatory centipedes, huntsman spiders and larger arachnids – and small cave mammals.

Binomial nomenclature 
Dr. Jäger asked Dr. Ana Lúcia Tourinho, specialist in Opiliones taxonomy, and she concludes that the harvestman is probably a species of the genus Gagrella in the family Sclerosomatidae, with some 1300 other known species. Dr. Jäger stated that his main interest is in huntsman spiders, not harvestmen, but he will be glad if the species had a name. Three more samples were collected in Laos and are now preserved in pure ethanol, which will allow their DNA to be sequence and thus place it in a more adequate genus. The species is still undescribed without a scientific name.

References

Undescribed arthropod species
Harvestmen
Arthropods of Asia
Cave arachnids